Transmutation (Mutatis Mutandis) is the first album by Bill Laswell's ever-changing "supergroup" Praxis. The album was released in 1992 and features Buckethead on guitar, Bootsy Collins on bass and vocals, Brain on drums, Bernie Worrell on keyboards and DJ AF Next Man Flip on turntables.

Transmutation features a wide range of genres such as heavy metal, funk, hip hop, ambient, jazz and blues, creating a unique style of avant-garde music, with extended guitar and keyboard solos, and highly improvised passages.

Track listing 

Note: Track 8 contains an interpolation of the title theme from the Japanese TV series Giant Robot, a rendition of which also featured on Buckethead's Bucketheadland album. The track also features one of the many themes Akira Ifukube wrote for Toho production's Godzilla films.

Personnel
Personnel as per Discogs.

Praxis:
Bootsy Collins – space bass, vocals
Buckethead – guitar, toys
Brain – drums
Bernie Worrell – synthesizer, clavinet & vital organ
AF Next Man Flip (Lord of the Paradox) – turntable, mixer
Recorded at Greenpoint Studios, Brooklyn, New York
Conceived and constructed by Bill Laswell
Robert Musso, Imad Mansour, Paul Berry, Oz Fritz – engineers
Howie Weinberg – mastering
James Koehnline – artwork
Thi Linh Le – art direction, photography
Aldo Sampieri – design

A Taste of Mutation EP

A Taste of Mutation is an EP by supergroup Praxis, released in 1992 through Bill Laswell's label Axiom and featuring four songs from their debut album Transmutation (Mutatis Mutandis).

Track listing

Animal Behavior single

Animal Behavior is the first and only single by supergroup Praxis.
The song was a natural choice to promote the band's debut album as well as Bill Laswell's new label Axiom since it was the only song of the album to contain lyrics. The vocals were done by former P-Funk member Bootsy Collins who also plays "space bass" while his P-Funk colleague Bernie Worrell can be heard on keyboards. Furthermore, the core members, San Francisco Bay Area musicians Brain (drums) and Buckethead (guitars) plus band leader Bill Laswell (samples) were assisted by turntablist Af Next Man Flip (aka Afrika Baby Bam of the Jungle Brothers).

The single includes three different versions of the title track written by Collins, Laswell and Buckethead, an edited album version from Transmutation (Mutatis Mutandis), a short radio edit and a third version that was used for the music video. The original seven-minute album version was also released on the EP A Taste of Mutation in the same year and later included to the Axiom compilation Funkcronomicon in 1995 while the video edit was re-released in 1993 on Manifestation: Axiom Collection II. The song also was included as the last part of the suite "Cosmic Trigger" on the album Axiom Ambient - Lost in the Translation in 1994.

Track listing

Video

It features frequent scenes shot in night vision, footage of guitarist Buckethead moving around and Rammellzee.
When singer Bootsy Collins starts singing the first verse, another monster made out of soda cans appears. The video later shows how Buckethead fights the first robot with his severed hand but the monster manages to decapitate him. After that the band is shown playing the song in night vision. A scarecrow with a square head appears when the mellow part of the song starts. The members of the band are shown against a sunset background. The video ends with still shots of all the band members and the music fading out. The video clip was played on MTV's Amp and was included in Buckethead's 2006 DVD Secret Recipe.

Personnel
Buckethead: guitar, toys
Bootsy Collins: space bass, vocals
Bernie Worrell: synthesizer, clavinet, vital organ
Af Next Man Flip (Lord of The Paradox): turntable, mixer
Brain: drums
Bill Laswell: samples, sounds
James Koehnline: Cover artist

References

External links 
 
 Transmutation (Mutatis Mutandis) at Bandcamp

1992 albums
Axiom (record label) albums
Albums produced by Bill Laswell
Praxis (band) albums